Poliksena Shishkina-Iavein (April 1875 – March 1947) was a Russian Empire and Soviet suffragette and physician.

Life
Poliksena Nestorovna Shishkina-Iavein was born in April 1875 in Nikolaev, Russian Empire (now Mykolaiv, Ukraine). She married a professor at the Medical-Surgical Academy, Georgi Iulievich Iavein, in 1900 while studying at the St Petersburg Women's Medical Institute. They had a daughter and a son together before she became one of the first women to graduate from the Institute in 1904. During World War I, Shishkina-Iavein taught medical courses, worked in a hospital for soldiers and helped to organize public canteens and women's shelters. The family left St Petersburg after the October Revolution of 1917 and moved to newly independent Estonia, but Shishkina-Iavein was not allowed to practice medicine there. After her husband's death in 1920, she returned to Leningrad (as St Petersburg was now named). She survived the Siege of Leningrad during World War II and died there in March 1947.

Activities
Shishkina-Iavein became chairwoman of the All-Russian League for Women's Equality in 1910 and changed the policy of the League from a general goal of universal democracy to a more-focused pursuit of women's suffrage through legislative action. It became the "largest and most powerful women’s political organization in Russia" during her tenure. Shishkina-Iavein wrote for the magazine Jus Suffragi, the official journal of the International Woman Suffrage Alliance, and had a lot of contacts with foreign feminists. The League was somewhat successful in improving women's rights during the Fourth State Duma of 1912–17.

Notes

References

1875 births
1947 deaths
Feminists from the Russian Empire
Physicians from the Russian Empire
Women's rights activists from the Russian Empire
Soviet women physicians
Physicians from Saint Petersburg